Julian Salamon (born 1 May 1991) is an Austrian footballer who currently plays for SC Ortmann.

He has previously played for SC Neusiedl am See 1919, SC-ESV Parndorf 1919 and SC Wiener Neustadt.

Honours

Club
SC-ESV Parndorf 1919
 Austrian Regional League East (1): 2012-13

Personal

He is the brother of professional footballer Thomas Salamon.

References

External links
 
 
 Julian Salamon at ÖFB

1991 births
Living people
Austrian footballers
SV Mattersburg players
FK Austria Wien players
SC Wiener Neustadt players
SC-ESV Parndorf 1919 players
Association football forwards